Nebria pazi is a species of ground beetle in the Nebriinae subfamily that can be found in Bejar and Gredos mountains of Spain.

References

External links
Nebria pazi at Fauna Europaea

pazi
Beetles described in 1867
Endemic fauna of Spain
Beetles of Europe